Marc Garneau Collegiate Institute (Marc Garneau CI, MGCI or Garneau), formerly known as Overlea Secondary School, is a high school in Toronto, Ontario, Canada, and part of the Toronto District School Board. It is the host school of the Talented Offerings for Programs in the Sciences (TOPS) program, a selective math, science and English enrichment program.

History
Overlea Secondary School, the third high school in the former suburb of East York, opened its doors in 1972 with 250 students as one of the first open concept schools in Canada. On September 4, 1973 it had 400 pupils and 42 staff. On October 16, 1987, Overlea S.S. was renamed 'Marc Garneau Collegiate Institute' after Canada's first astronaut Marc Garneau, who regularly visits the school and its students. It hosts the TOPS program and has offered pilot courses in Earth and Space Science, Science Journalism, and Cisco Networking. The school was built in the jurisdiction within  North York as opposed to East York. Before 1998, this school was part of the East York Board of Education.

It is the only high school in Canada dedicated to helping students with careers in the space sciences. Valley Park Middle School is the main school that feeds students into MGCI but there are other schools as well such as Cosburn Middle School.

In 1993, MGCI was honoured with the Roberta Bondar Science and Technology Award in recognition of the school's achievements in numerous student programs, particularly its Students for the Exploration and Development of Space chapter, which no longer exists. Renovations to the school in 1998 removed many of the open concept elements of the school's original design. Despite declining enrolment across the Toronto District School Board, MGCI is one of the most densely populated secondary school institutions in the province of Ontario as of 2015, operating at around 131% capacity with a building that can hold 1323 students. High enrollment has resulted in around 12 portables occupying a large portion of the school's back field. .

Overview

Student life
There are numerous extra curricular activities at Marc Garneau. Some of the clubs include chapters of DECA, MGCI EcoTeam, MGCI Muslim Student Association, MGCI osu Club, Student Council, The Reckoner of MGCI, and the Key Club. The school has had several first and second-place finishes in the International DECA Competition.

Garneau provides students with a wide variety of sports teams including: Football, Rugby, Basketball, Soccer, Volley Ball, Baseball, Field Hockey, Ultimate Frisbee, Cricket, Tennis, and an annual ball hockey tournament. The official mascot for the school is the cougar.

Offered extracurricular activities include the Concert Band, Choir, Guitar Club, Music Council, Mock Trials, Reach for the Top, and Stage Band. Although there is no official strings program offered by the school, students play in the completely student-run String Orchestra.

Drama students at Marc Garneau perform musicals and plays, and participate in many activities, such as the Canadian Improv Games and the Sears Festival.

The Reckoner of MGCI is the school's newspaper. The Reckoner's website is updated several times a week and a print edition is distributed monthly. With a staff of over eighty students, the site's authors consist of volunteers from all grades who undergo an application process in early September. The Reckoner was named "Best Volunteer Newspaper" at the "Toronto Star High School Newspaper Awards" in 2014 and "Best Electronic Newspaper" in 2011 and 2014. In 2015, The Reckoner was named "Best Electronic Newspaper" once again by the Toronto Star.

Recognition and awards
In 2004, Maclean's magazine ranked the TOPS program at MGCI as among the best schools in Canada, suggesting it was the top-ranked program for students pursuing science or mathematics in their later studies. The September 2006 issue of Toronto Life also stated that MGCI was the best high school in Toronto for mathematics and science, largely crediting the TOPS program.

Notable alumni
Charles Khabouth - nightclub owner

See also
List of high schools in Ontario

References

External links
Marc Garneau Collegiate Institute
TDSB Profile
Canadian Space Resource Centre
TOPS Program
School Library Website
The Reckoner of MGCI
Mathematics & Computing Contests

Schools in the TDSB
High schools in Toronto
Educational institutions established in 1973
1973 establishments in Ontario